Joe Bygraves (26 May 1931 – 16 January 2012) was a British heavyweight boxer. Bygraves turned professional in 1953, and after an impressive early career he successfully challenged Kitione Lave for the vacant Commonwealth Heavyweight belt in 1956. Bygraves defended the title on three occasions, knocking-out Henry Cooper and holding Dick Richardson to a draw before losing the championship to Joe Erskine. Bygraves immigrated to Britain as a youth but did not take British citizenship until the end of his fighting career in 1967.

Boxing career
Bygraves was born into a large family of 11 siblings, in Kingston, Jamaica in 1931. He immigrated to Britain at the age of 15 and settled in Liverpool. He began his amateur career at the age of 17 first as a light heavyweight and then moving up to the heavyweight division. He was successful at both weights, winning amateur county titles.

Bygraves turned professional in 1953, managed by Johnny Campbell, his first paid encounter was against Don Maxwell on 12 February. The fight lasted just 65 seconds, Bygraves winning by knockout. Bygraves won the next five fights, six and eight round encounters, mainly on points decisions, but he was stopped for the first time in his professional career by Joe Crickmar in a novice heavyweight competition. Despite the loss Bygraves' career continued to impress and by the end of 1954 he had accumulated 24 wins to only 4 losses. His final fight of 1954 was a loss by points decision to Polly Smith, a fighter he had beaten just two months prior.

Bygraves began 1955 in the same way he ended 1954, with a loss. After several months away from the ring, Bygraves returned to face rising British fighter Henry Cooper. The eight round scheduled fight went the distance, with Cooper given the decision. Bygraves followed this with a string of four wins, including a victory over Tongan Kitione Lave, and his first fight outside the United Kingdom, a technical knockout of Hugo Salfeld in Germany. Bygraves then travelled to Italy, for a string of three fights. He lost the first to European Boxing Champion Franco Cavicchi when he was disqualified in the eighth round, but then took two victories when he beat Aldo Pellegrini in Milan and Uber Bacilieri in Bologna.

On 24 February 1956, Bygraves travelled to Sweden to face the then unbeaten Ingemar Johansson. The eight round contest ended in a points decision for Johansson. Two months later, Bygraves was back in a British ring, facing ex-British heavyweight champion Jack Gardner, whom he stopped in the second round. A second successive win, this time against Marcel Limage in Cardiff, gave Bygraves a shot at the vacant Commonwealth Heavyweight title. Despite living in Britain for near ten years, Bygraves was not allowed to fight for the British titles as he was not born there. His opponent for the title fight was Kitione Lave, who he had beaten the previous year. Held at the Empire Pool in London on 26 June 1956, the match was scheduled for 15 rounds, the first time Bygraves had contested a fight of this length. The bout went the distance, with the judges declaring Bygraves the victor, and new Commonwealth champion.

Bygraves lost his next fight to American Wayne Bethea, and this was followed by a win over another ex-British Heavyweight champion, Johnny Williams. His first title defence was on 19 February 1957, against Henry Cooper. The fight is regarded as one of Bygraves best of his career, stopping Cooper via technical knockout in the ninth round. Just three months later, Bygraves defended the Commonwealth belt again, on this occasion the challenger was Welshman Dick Richardson. The fight ended in a draw, and as holder Bygraves retained his title. His third and final defence of his Commonwealth title again came from Wales, this time against Joe Erskine. As with the Richardson fight, the bout went the full fifteen rounds, but on this occasion the decision went to Erskine, stripping Bygraves of his title.

After the Erskine fight, Bygraves struggled for success, and in more and more fights he ended as the loser. He still faced some notable fighters included losses to Americans Willie Pastrano and Zora Folley, and another failed attempt at Ingemar Johansson. One of his last wins was over Olympic gold medalist Franco De Piccoli in 1963, and in 1965 he failed to beat Canadian heavyweight champion George Chuvalo at the Albert Hall in London.  His last recorded professional bout was against Hector Eduardo Corletti on 20 March 1967.

Professional boxing record

|-
|align="center" colspan=8|42 Wins (22 knockouts, 20 decisions), 28 Losses (7 knockouts, 21 decisions), 2 Draws 
|-
| align="center" style="border-style: none none solid solid; background: #e3e3e3"|Result
| align="center" style="border-style: none none solid solid; background: #e3e3e3"|Record
| align="center" style="border-style: none none solid solid; background: #e3e3e3"|Opponent
| align="center" style="border-style: none none solid solid; background: #e3e3e3"|Type
| align="center" style="border-style: none none solid solid; background: #e3e3e3"|Round
| align="center" style="border-style: none none solid solid; background: #e3e3e3"|Date
| align="center" style="border-style: none none solid solid; background: #e3e3e3"|Location
| align="center" style="border-style: none none solid solid; background: #e3e3e3"|Notes
|-align=center
|Loss
|
|align=left| Hector Eduardo Corletti
|PTS
|10
|20 Mar 1967
|align=left| London Hilton on Park Lane Hotel, Mayfair, London
|align=left|
|-
|Loss
|
|align=left| George Chuvalo
|PTS
|10
|7 Dec 1965
|align=left| Royal Albert Hall, Kensington, London
|align=left|
|-
|Loss
|
|align=left| Gerhard Zech
|PTS
|10
|6 Mar 1965
|align=left| Neue Sporthalle, Hannover, Lower Saxony
|align=left|
|-
|Win
|
|align=left| Albert Westphal
|KO
|1
|13 Feb 1965
|align=left| Ernst Merck Halle, Hamburg
|align=left|
|-
|Loss
|
|align=left| Billy Walker
|DQ
|6
|28 Jan 1964
|align=left| The Olympia, Kensington, London
|align=left|
|-
|Loss
|
|align=left| Gerhard Zech
|TKO
|9
|8 Nov 1963
|align=left| Sportpalast, Schoeneberg, Berlin
|align=left|
|-
|Loss
|
|align=left| Santo Amonti
|PTS
|10
|13 Sep 1963
|align=left| Palazzetto dello Sport, Rome, Lazio
|align=left|
|-
|Loss
|
|align=left| Ray Shiel
|DQ
|5
|22 Aug 1963
|align=left| Liverpool Stadium, Liverpool, Merseyside
|align=left|
|-
|Win
|
|align=left| Franco De Piccoli
|KO
|5
|7 Jun 1963
|align=left| Palazzetto dello Sport, Rome, Lazio
|align=left|
|-
|Loss
|
|align=left| Bill Nielsen
|TKO
|6
|21 Apr 1963
|align=left| Johanneshovs Isstadion, Stockholm
|align=left|
|-
|Draw
|
|align=left| Wim Snoek
|PTS
|10
|8 Apr 1963
|align=left| Rotterdam
|align=left|
|-
|Loss
|
|align=left| Karl Mildenberger
|PTS
|3
|30 Nov 1962
|align=left| Festhalle Frankfurt, Frankfurt, Hesse
|align=left|
|-
|Loss
|
|align=left| Wayne Bethea
|UD
|10
|22 Sep 1962
|align=left| The National Stadium, Kingston, Jamaica
|align=left|
|-
|Loss
|
|align=left| Ingemar Johansson
|TKO
|7
|9 Feb 1962
|align=left| Maesshallen Sports Hall, Gothenburg
|align=left|
|-
|Win
|
|align=left| Alex Barrow
|KO
|2
|4 Dec 1961
|align=left| Granby Halls, Leicester, Leicestershire
|align=left|
|-
|Win
|
|align=left| Gerhard Zech
|TKO
|4
|3 Nov 1961
|align=left| Ernst Merck Halle, Hamburg
|align=left|
|-
|Loss
|
|align=left| Franco Cavicchi
|PTS
|10
|27 Jun 1960
|align=left| Bologna, Emilia-Romagna
|align=left|
|-
|Loss
|
|align=left| Joe Hemphill
|PTS
|8
|18 May 1960
|align=left| Chicago Stadium, Chicago, Illinois
|align=left|
|-
|Loss
|
|align=left| Roy Harris
|UD
|10
|25 Aug 1959
|align=left| Sam Houston Coliseum, Houston, Texas
|align=left|
|-
|Loss
|
|align=left| Giacomo Bozzano
|PTS
|10
|19 Apr 1959
|align=left| Velodromo Vigorelli, Milan, Lombardy
|align=left|
|-
|Win
|
|align=left| Feleti Fred Kaho
|TKO
|7
|2 Mar 1959
|align=left| Farrer Street Stadium, Middlesbrough, Yorkshire
|align=left|
|-
|Loss
|
|align=left| Zora Folley
|TKO
|9
|24 Nov 1958
|align=left| Granby Halls, Leicester, Leicestershire
|align=left|
|-
|Loss
|
|align=left| Willie Pastrano
|PTS
|10
|21 Apr 1958
|align=left| Granby Halls, Leicester, Leicestershire
|align=left|
|-
|Win
|
|align=left| Joey Armstrong
|TKO
|3
|10 Feb 1958
|align=left| Leeds, Yorkshire
|align=left|
|-
|Loss
|
|align=left| Joe Erskine
|PTS
|15
|25 Nov 1957
|align=left| Granby Halls, Leicester, Leicestershire
|align=left|
|-
|Win
|
|align=left| Kitione Lave
|PTS
|10
|18 Sep 1957
|align=left| Pontypridd
|align=left|
|-
|Loss
|
|align=left| Heinz Neuhaus
|DQ
|6
|15 Jun 1957
|align=left| Westfalenhallen, Dortmund, North Rhine-Westphalia
|align=left|
|-
|Draw
|
|align=left| Dick Richardson
|PTS
|15
|27 May 1957
|align=left| Maindy Stadium, Cardiff
|align=left|
|-
|Loss
|
|align=left| George Chuvalo
|PTS
|10
|7 Dec 1965
|align=left| Royal Albert Hall, Kensington, London
|align=left|
|-
|Win
|
|align=left| Henry Cooper
|KO
|9
|19 Feb 1957
|align=left| Earls Court Arena, Kensington, London
|align=left|
|-
|Win
|
|align=left| Johnny Williams
|TKO
|6
|16 Nov 1956
|align=left| Belle Vue Zoological Gardens, Belle Vue, Manchester
|align=left|
|-
|Loss
|
|align=left| Wayne Bethea
|TKO
|5
|24 Sep 1956
|align=left| St. Nicholas Arena, New York City
|align=left|
|-
|Win
|
|align=left| Kitione Lave
|PTS
|15
|26 Jun 1956
|align=left| Empire Pool, Wembley, London
|align=left|
|-
|Win
|
|align=left| Marcel Limage
|RTD
|8
|7 May 1956
|align=left| Maindy Stadium, Cardiff
|align=left|
|-
|Win
|
|align=left| Jack Gardner
|TKO
|2
|24 Apr 1956
|align=left| Earls Court Arena, Kensington, London
|align=left|
|-
|Loss
|
|align=left| Ingemar Johansson
|PTS
|8
|24 Feb 1956
|align=left| Masshallen, Gothenburg
|align=left|
|-
|Win
|
|align=left| Uber Bacilieri
|PTS
|10
|23 Jan 1956
|align=left| Bologna, Emilia-Romagna
|align=left|
|-
|Win
|
|align=left| Aldo Pellegrini
|KO
|1
|17 Dec 1955
|align=left| Palasport di San Siro, Milan, Lombardy
|align=left|
|-
|Loss
|
|align=left| Franco Cavicchi
|DQ
|8
|31 Oct 1955
|align=left| Palazzo dello Sport, Bologna, Emilia-Romagna
|align=left|
|-
|Win
|
|align=left| Kitione Lave
|PTS
|8
|19 Sep 1955
|align=left| Perry Barr Stadium, Birmingham, West Midlands
|align=left|
|-
|Win
|
|align=left| Hugo Salfeld
|TKO
|5
|4 Sep 1955
|align=left| Westfalenhallen, Dortmund, North Rhine-Westphalia
|align=left|
|-
|Win
|
|align=left| Peter Bates
|PTS
|8
|6 Jun 1955
|align=left| Nottingham Ice Stadium, Nottingham, Nottinghamshire
|align=left|
|-
|Win
|
|align=left| Eddie Hearn
|KO
|4
|5 May 1955
|align=left| Liverpool Stadium, Liverpool, Merseyside
|align=left|
|-
|Loss
|
|align=left| Henry Cooper
|PTS
|8
|18 Apr 1955
|align=left| Manor Place Baths, Walworth, London
|align=left|
|-
|Loss
|
|align=left| Ed "Polly" Smith
|PTS
|8
|4 Nov 1954
|align=left| Liverpool Stadium, Liverpool, Merseyside
|align=left|
|-
|Win
|
|align=left| Fred Powell
|PTS
|8
|25 Oct 1954
|align=left| Carmarthen Market Hall, Carmarthen
|align=left|
|-
|Win
|
|align=left| Ed "Polly" Smith
|PTS
|8
|12 Oct 1954
|align=left| Royal Albert Hall, Kensington, London
|align=left|
|-
|Win
|
|align=left| Paddy Slavin
|PTS
|8
|2 Oct 1954
|align=left| King's Hall, Belfast
|align=left|
|-
|Win
|
|align=left| Clair Redmond
|KO
|3
|19 Aug 1954
|align=left| Liverpool Stadium, Liverpool, Merseyside
|align=left|
|-
|Win
|
|align=left| Peter Bates
|PTS
|8
|2 Jul 1954
|align=left| Belle Vue Zoological Gardens, Belle Vue, Manchester
|align=left|
|-
|Win
|
|align=left| Frank Bell
|PTS
|8
|30 Apr 1954
|align=left| Belle Vue Zoological Gardens, Belle Vue, Manchester
|align=left|
|-
|Win
|
|align=left| Paddy Slavin
|PTS
|8
|14 Apr 1954
|align=left| Liverpool Stadium, Liverpool, Merseyside
|align=left|
|-
|Win
|
|align=left| Terry O'Connor
|TKO
|3
|30 Mar 1954
|align=left| Earls Court Arena, Kensington, London
|align=left|
|-
|Win
|
|align=left| Joe Crickmar
|PTS
|8
|18 Mar 1954
|align=left| Liverpool Stadium, Liverpool, Merseyside
|align=left|
|-
|Win
|
|align=left| Terry McDonald
|KO
|1
|12 Mar 1954
|align=left| Belle Vue Zoological Gardens, Belle Vue, Manchester
|align=left|
|-
|Loss
|
|align=left| Albert Finch
|PTS
|8
|23 Feb 1954
|align=left| Royal Albert Hall, Kensington, London
|align=left|
|-
|Win
|
|align=left| Paddy Slavin
|PTS
|8
|11 Feb 1954
|align=left| Liverpool Stadium, Liverpool, Merseyside
|align=left|
|-
|Win
|
|align=left| Simon Templar
|PTS
|8
|18 Dec 1953
|align=left| Tower Circus, Blackpool, Lancashire
|align=left|
|-
|Win
|
|align=left| Fred Powell
|TKO
|7
|10 Nov 1953
|align=left| Empress Hall, Earl's Court, Kensington, London
|align=left|
|-
|Win
|
|align=left| Cliff Purnell
|KO
|2
|29 Oct 1953
|align=left| Liverpool Stadium, Liverpool, Merseyside
|align=left|
|-
|Win
|
|align=left| Peter Toch
|TKO
|3
|20 Oct 1953
|align=left| Streatham Ice Arena, Streatham, London, England
|align=left|
|-
|Win
|
|align=left| George Stern
|DQ
|3
|8 Oct 1953
|align=left| Liverpool Stadium, Liverpool, Merseyside
|align=left|
|-
|Loss
|
|align=left| Cliff Purnell
|PTS
|6
|17 Sep 1953
|align=left| Liverpool Stadium, Liverpool, Merseyside
|align=left|
|-
|Win
|
|align=left| Hugh Ferns
|PTS
|6
|3 Sep 1953
|align=left| Liverpool Stadium, Liverpool, Merseyside
|align=left|
|-
|Win
|
|align=left| Alex Roman
|TKO
|1
|13 Aug 1953
|align=left| Liverpool Stadium, Liverpool, Merseyside
|align=left|
|-
|Loss
|
|align=left| Joe Crickmar
|TKO
|5
|16 Jul 1953
|align=left| Liverpool Stadium, Liverpool, Merseyside
|align=left|
|-
|Loss
|
|align=left| Joe Crickmar
|KO
|2
|9 Jun 1953
|align=left| White City Stadium, White City, London
|align=left|
|-
|Win
|
|align=left| Peter McMann
|TKO
|1
|14 May 1953
|align=left| Liverpool Stadium, Liverpool, Merseyside
|align=left|
|-
|Win
|
|align=left| Wally Curtis
|PTS
|8
|23 Apr 1953
|align=left| Liverpool Stadium, Liverpool, Merseyside
|align=left|
|-
|Win
|
|align=left| Ken Wyatt
|PTS
|6
|9 Apr 1953
|align=left| Liverpool Stadium, Liverpool, Merseyside
|align=left|
|-
|Win
|
|align=left| Les Johnson
|PTS
|6
|26 Mar 1953
|align=left| Liverpool Stadium, Liverpool, Merseyside
|align=left|
|-
|Win
|
|align=left| Hugh Ferns
|PTS
|6
|12 Mar 1953
|align=left| Liverpool Stadium, Liverpool, Merseyside
|align=left|
|-
|Win
|
|align=left| Don Maxwell
|KO
|1
|12 Feb 1953
|align=left| Liverpool Stadium, Liverpool, Merseyside
|align=left|
|}

References

 * Biography
 
 Empire Title For Joe Bygraves 1956 British Pathe

1931 births
2012 deaths
Heavyweight boxers
Sportspeople from Kingston, Jamaica
Boxers from Liverpool
Migrants from British Jamaica to the United Kingdom
British male boxers